Bhai Tara Singh Wan (1687–30 March 1726) was an eighteenth-century Sikh martyr. He was from the village of Wan, also known as Wan Tara Singh and Dall-Wan now in  Tarn taran district tehsil bhikhiwind of the Eastern Punjab.

Family background
His father, Gurdas Singh, had received the rites of the Khalsa in the time of Guru Gobind Singh Sahib, and had taken part in the Battle of Amritsar (6 April 1709), in which Bhai Mani Singh led the Sikhs and in which Har Sahai, a revenue official of Patti, was killed at his (Gurdas Singh's) hands. Baba Gurdas Singh took martyrdom in Bajwara (Hoshiarpur) when he went along with Baba Banda Singh to fight for Sirhind. Baba Gurdas Singh was married in next village of Rajoke.

Early life
Bhai Tara Singh, the eldest of the five sons of Gurdas Singh, was born around 1687. He took Amrit from Bhai Mani Singh. Receiving the rites of initiation, he grew up to be a devout Sikh, skilled in the martial arts.

Martyrdom
As persistent persecution drove the Sikhs out of their homes to seek shelter in hills and forests, Tara Singh collected around him a band of desperadoes and lived defiantly at Wan, where he, according to Ratan Singh Bhangu's Pracheen Panth Prakash, possessed ajag'Iror landgrant. In his vaar or enclosure made with thick piles of dried branches of thorny trees, he gave refuge to any Sikh who came to him to escape persecution. The faujdar sent a contingent of 25 horse and 80 foot to Wan but Tara Singh's colleague Sardar met them in the fields, fought back and routed the invaders with several dead, including their commander, nephew of the faujdar and got martyrdom himself. Ja'far Begh reported the matter to Zakariya Khan, who sent a punitive expedition consisting of 2,000 horse, 5 elephants, 40 light guns and 4 cannononwheels under his deputy, Momin Khan. Tara Singh had barely 22 men with him at that time. They kept the Lahore force at bay through the night but were killed to a man in the handtohand fight on the following day 1726. Their heads were taken back to Lahore and thrown in blind well where Gurudwara Shaheed Singhania now stands in Landa Bazar. A Gurudwara Sahib now marks the site where the dead bodies of Bhai Tara Singh and his 20 companions were cremated.

References

Indian Sikhs
Sikh martyrs
History of Sikhism
1687 births
Punjabi people
1726 deaths